Karl Franz Friedrich Chrysander was a German music historian and critic, whose edition of the works of George Frideric Handel and authoritative writings on many other composers established him as a pioneer of 19th-century musicology.

Between 1858 and 1902, the Händel-Gesellschaft or "German Handel Society" edition of Handel's collected works was published, and this was almost entirely the work of Chrysander;

Publications
Chrysander made a number of publications under the Händelgesellschaft name (see Händegesellschaft – volumes with Chrysander as publisher).

Chrysander's other publications include:

See also
List of compositions by George Frideric Handel
Arcangelo Corelli

References

External links
IMSLP Category:Scores edited by Friedrich Chrysander

German music publishers (people)
Music publications